Batesville may refer to:

Places in the United States
 Batesville, Alabama
 Batesville, Arkansas
 Batesville, Georgia
 Batesville, Indiana
 Batesville, Mississippi
 Batesville, Missouri
 Batesville, Ohio
 Batesville, South Carolina
 Batesville, Texas
 Batesville, Virginia

Other uses
 Batesville Casket Company